Schottius may refer to:

 Andreas Schott (Andreas Schottius)
 Gaspar Schott (Caspar Schottius)